This is the statistical table of Spain national football team managers. The Spain national football team represents Spain in international men's football competitions since 1920.

Until the 1960s, there were several periods where more than one coach was deemed to be in charge of the team. In the table, the matches are counted only once, with each partnership included as a managerial spell (some coaches therefore have more than one entry – for example José María Mateos was involved in two three-man partnerships then later took sole charge) and the individual manager's total included as a note where applicable.

Statistics

Notes

External links
 Spain national team managers at BDFutbol
Todos los seleccionadores (all the selectors) at Selección Española de Fútbol (official site) 

 
Spain
football team managers